Aminocandin is an echinocandin antifungal. It works by targeting the glucan in fungal cell walls.

References

External links
 

Antifungals
Echinocandins